Atsion may refer to:
Atsion, New Jersey, an unincorporated community within Shamong Township, Burlington County
Lake Atsion